Sometimes a Little Brain Damage Can Help is the first book written by George Carlin, published in 1984. It is primarily a collection of jokes and his stand up routines. The title is a saying of Carlin's, which appears in his second book, Brain Droppings. The slogan also appears on the back of some of his concert t-shirts.

1984 books
Comedy books
Books by George Carlin